Events in the year 1653 in Japan.

Incumbents
Monarch: Go-Kōmyō

Births
date unknown - Chikamatsu Monzaemon, playwright (d. 1725)

 
1650s in Japan
Japan
Years of the 17th century in Japan